The Men's 200 metre individual medley SM11 swimming event at the 2004 Summer Paralympics was competed on 22 September. It was won by Viktor Smyrnov, representing .

Final round

22 Sept. 2004, evening session

References

M